Brigadier Desmond Young OBE, MC (27 December 189127 June 1966) was an Australian-born British Army officer, newspaper publisher and writer. He travelled widely in his youth, accompanying his father in his work as a maritime salvage expert. He attended the University of Oxford but was asked to leave after he failed to attend a single lecture. Young found work in Malaya as a rubber planter and operated a nightclub in London. Shortly after the outbreak of the First World War he joined the British Army, serving as an officer in the King's Royal Rifle Corps. He was wounded in action and won a Military Cross in June 1918. After the War Young worked as a newspaper reporter, editor and publisher in the South African Cape Times and the Indian Allahabad Pioneer.

Young joined the British Indian Army in 1941, during the Second World War. He was appointed to command the 10th Indian Infantry Brigade in the North African campaign. Young was captured during the 1942 Battle of Gazala and briefly met the German commander Field Marshal Erwin Rommel. Imprisoned in Italy he escaped and ended the war as editor of a pro-Allied newspaper in Switzerland. Young published Rommel: The Desert Fox, a biography of the German general, in 1950 and it was adapted into the 1951 film The Desert Fox: The Story of Rommel. The work has been criticised for its overly positive portrayal of Rommel's actions. In 1960 Young published Fountain of the Elephants, a biography of the French adventurer Benoît de Boigne. He also wrote two autobiographies.

Early life 

Desmond Young was born in Port Adelaide, South Australia in 1891. His father, Frederick William Young was a marine salvage expert and in his youth Young accompanied him on trips around the world. Young matriculated at the University of Oxford but attended no lectures and was asked to leave. He afterwards travelled to Malaya to work as a rubber planter. At one point he ran the Quadrant nightclub in London but claimed the police forced him to leave the business.

On 12 September 1914, shortly after the start of the First World War, Young joined the British Army in the temporary rank of second lieutenant. On 1 October he was promoted to lieutenant in the 9th battalion of the King's Royal Rifle Corps and on 13 February 1915 to captain. Young was wounded while serving in the trenches of the Western Front and, while recovering, missed serving in the Third Battle of Ypres. He passed his time in convalescence writing war poetry. Having returned to the front, on 26 July 1918, at which point he was on the general list of officers, he was awarded the Military Cross for "conspicuous gallantry and devotion to duty". During an enemy attack he gathered disorganised troops to form a defence around a brigade's headquarters, halting the attack. He afterwards helped distribute ammunition under heavy machine gun fire.

After the war Young travelled to South Africa where he found work as a reporter at the Cape Times. He was later appointed its editor and then its publisher. Young then travelled to India to manage the Allahabad Pioneer.

Second World War 

During the Second World War Young received an emergency commission as a second lieutenant in the British Indian Army on 12 April 1941. He rose quickly in rank and held command of the 10th Indian Infantry Brigade during Operation Aberdeen, a 5 June 1942 attack ordered by Lieutenant-General Neil Ritchie during the Battle of Gazala. The 10th captured all of their objectives at a thinly-held portion of the German line at Aslagh Ridge but subsequent British attacks on the main defensive line failed. A counter-attack by the German 21st Panzer Division penetrated the British defences in an area of ground known as The Cauldron and disordered part of Young's brigade. A separate attack by the 15th Panzer Division struck a gap in the British minefields south-west of Bir el Harmat and destroyed the headquarters of Young's brigade and that of the 9th Indian Infantry Brigade. The 15th Panzer then trapped the remnants of Young's brigade, alongside other units in The Cauldron, and caused them to surrender. Young was one of 3,100 men captured on 6 June.

After his capture a German officer tried to compel Young to order the surrender of a British artillery position. He refused and the incident was interrupted by the arrival of the German commander Field Marshal Erwin Rommel. Rommel ordered the German officer to cease his actions, advising that Young was not required to issue such an order. Young was transferred to a prisoner-of-war camp in Italy, where he led the camp's escape committee. He escaped successfully to Switzerland where, by the war's end, he was editor of a pro-Allied newspaper.

Later life 

After the war, Young was appointed director of public relations at the Army's general headquarters in India. He was appointed an officer of the Order of the British Empire on 12 June 1947 for his work in this role. Despite only meeting Rommel once Young was inspired to write a biography of the man. Rommel: The Desert Fox was published in New York in 1950; it received some criticism for Young's positive description of the man, with Young's Daily News obituary stating Young had portrayed Rommel a "blue-eyed god who could do no wrong". Young's book was adapted by Nunnally Johnson into the 1951 film The Desert Fox: The Story of Rommel, with James Mason in the title role.

Young also wrote Fountain of the Elephants, a 1960 biography of the French adventurer in India Benoît de Boigne. He produced two memoirs, Try Anything Twice and the 1961 work All the Best Years. Young moved to Sark, an island in the English Channel governed by a feudal system, around 1962. He was married with two children and died at his home on Sark on 27 June 1966.

References

External links
 

1890s births
1966 deaths
King's Royal Rifle Corps officers
Recipients of the Military Cross
British Army personnel of World War I
Indian Army personnel of World War II
British biographers
British autobiographers
British World War II prisoners of war
New Zealand Officers of the Order of the British Empire
People from Sark
World War II prisoners of war held by Germany